Reel Talk is a syndicated weekend movie review series hosted by film critics Jeffrey Lyons and Alison Bailes. It was produced by, and originally ran exclusively on, WNBC, a New York City NBC affiliate.

Airtimes
The show initially aired as part of NBC All Night on Fridays and Saturdays.  The show usually aired at 4:00 a.m. on late Friday nights and/or late Saturday nights at 2:00 a.m.  It then launched into syndication in September 2007 via NBC Universal Domestic Television Distribution.  The program In Wine Country took the place of Reel Talk on the NBC All Night schedule.

Production and website
The show was produced by WNBC. Michael Avila was Executive Producer of Reel Talk.

In conjunction with the show's syndicated debut, an interactive website www.ReelTalkTV.com was simultaneously launched, offering viewers video reviews, extended interviews with celebrities, special web only features and trailers.

Celebrity guests
Past celebrities on the show have been:
Sean Penn
Judi Dench
Kirk Douglas
Donald Sutherland
Kiefer Sutherland 
Antonio Banderas
Pierce Brosnan
Samuel L. Jackson
Morgan Freeman
George Clooney
Forest Whitaker

Cancellation
On May 28, 2009, NBC Universal announced the cancellation of Reel Talk due to Jeffrey Lyons and Alison Bailes losing their jobs with WNBC. The last edition of Reel Talk aired in late June 2009.

References

External links
 
 

Film criticism television series
First-run syndicated television programs in the United States
2005 American television series debuts
2009 American television series endings
Television series by Universal Television